The Qing dynasty was a dynasty of China that existed from 1636 to 1912.

Qing may also refer to:
 Qing (concept) ("feelings"), a concept in Chinese philosophy
 Qing (color), a Chinese color term, inclusive of shades of green, blue, and black.
 Qing, a Chinese abbreviation for Qinghai Province, China
 Qing, a Chinese abbreviation for Qingdao in Shandong Province, China
 Qing County, in Hebei, China
 Qing, an old Chinese unit of area equal to 100 mu, whose value has varied over time and place
 Qing, the Chinese name for a sounding stone, a musical instrument

See also
 Ching (surname)
 Hing (surname)